Emily Palmer (died 1929) was a British politician.

Palmer was active in the co-operative and labour movements in Southampton.  She served as vice-chair of the Southampton Labour Representation Committee, and then as president of the Southampton Trades and Labour Council.  She was the first woman elected to Southampton Borough Council, and was also a magistrate in the city.

At the 1923 United Kingdom general election, Palmer contested the Isle of Wight for the Labour Party, but took third place, with only 7.1% of the vote.

In the late 1920s, Palmer began suffering with poor health, and in 1929, she committed suicide.

References

Year of birth missing
Councillors in Hampshire
Labour Party (UK) councillors
Labour Party (UK) parliamentary candidates
Politicians from Southampton
1929 suicides
Women councillors in England
British politicians who committed suicide